Captain Black may refer to:

 Captain Black (Captain Scarlet), a fictional character in the Captain Scarlet franchise
 Captain Black (Catch-22), a fictional character in the novel Catch-22
 Captain Black (tobacco brand), a brand of aromatic pipe tobaccos, cigars and cigarillos
 Code name used by the Ulster Freedom Fighters (UFF), a part of the Ulster Defence Association

See also
 Black Captain